Idiomictis aneuropa is a moth in the family Xyloryctidae. It was described by Edward Meyrick in 1935. It is found on Fiji.

References

Xyloryctidae
Moths described in 1935